The Bishop Druitt College (abbreviated as BDC), is an independent Anglican co-educational primary and secondary day school, located in southwest Coffs Harbour, on the Mid North Coast of New South Wales, Australia. Named after Cecil Druitt, the first Bishop of the Diocese of Grafton, the College consists of a primary, middle school and senior school section, for students from Year K to Year 12.

Background
Bishop Druitt College is an independent, co-educational Kindergarten to Year 12 Anglican school situated in North Boambee on the Mid North Coast of New South Wales.

The College commenced operations in 1994 with an enrolment of 57 primary school students. The original plan was for a school of just 600, but this has expanded through a building program to cater for an enrolment of over 1200 students.

Secondary curriculum

As well as compulsory study in English, Mathematics, Science, Personal Development and Health, the school provides opportunities for students to undertake electives in Technology and Applied Science, Geography, Creative and Performing Arts and Languages (including French and Japanese courses, which can be taken within the college campus, as well as Italian and German, through distance education).

School houses

Each student belongs to a tutor group and a house. The tutor group is horizontal (the same Year level) and the house is vertical (K-12).  Students usually remain in the same tutor group and house for the duration of their secondary enrolment.  Students participate in sporting events and pastoral care in these house groups.

The school's houses are named after significant people in Australia's history and are as follows:
  CotteeKay Cottee
  HollowsFred Hollows
  KngwarreyeEmily Kngwarreye
  Murray,Les Murray
  O'ShanePat O'Shane
  SutherlandJoan Sutherland

Principals 
The following individuals have served as Principal of Bishop Druitt College:

See also

 List of Anglican schools in New South Wales
 Anglican education in Australia

References

External links
 Bishop Druitt College
 Bishop Druitt College Library
Bishop Druitt College Campus Map

Anglican primary schools in New South Wales
Anglican secondary schools in New South Wales
Educational institutions established in 1994
1994 establishments in Australia
Education in Coffs Harbour